The Notification and Federal Employee Antidiscrimination and Retaliation Act of 2002 is a United States federal law that seeks to discourage federal managers and supervisors from engaging in unlawful discrimination and retaliation.  It is popularly called the No-FEAR Act, and is also known as Public Law 107–174.

Enactment
On August 18, 2000, a federal jury found the US Environmental Protection Agency (EPA) guilty of violating the civil rights of Dr. Marsha Coleman-Adebayo on the basis of race, sex, color and a hostile work environment, under the Civil Rights Act of 1964. She was awarded $600,000. The EPA had refused to promote Coleman-Adebayo shortly after she alleged the presence of environmental and health problems at the Brits, South Africa, vanadium mines.

Sparked by this outcome, Congressman F. James Sensenbrenner, Chairman of the House Judiciary Committee and Texas Congresswoman Sheila Jackson-Lee introduced the No-FEAR Act into Congress. Dr. Coleman-Adebayo founded the No FEAR Institute to organize support for the bill's purposes while continuing to work for the EPA. The No FEAR Institute spearheaded the No FEAR Coalition to advocate for passage of the Act.

President George W. Bush signed it into law on May 15, 2002, making it the first United States civil rights law of the 21st Century.

Criticism
Marsha Coleman-Adebayo and others have criticized implementation of the No-FEAR Act on grounds that agencies are abusing the provision allowing them a "reasonable" time to make their reimbursements to the General Fund of the Treasury. They have proposed a No-FEAR II Act to set a time limit for such reimbursements, and to increase the penalties for violations.

Book and movie

See also
Civil and political rights
Civil Rights Movement
Whistleblower

References

External links
 NOTIFICATION AND FEDERAL EMPLOYEE ANTIDISCRIMINATION AND RETALIATION ACT OF 2002
No FEAR Coalition web page
Report of the Department of the Interior
Report of the FDA
Reports of the Department of Homeland Security

Acts of the 107th United States Congress
Discrimination in the United States
Freedom of expression law
Public administration
United States federal civil rights legislation
United States federal labor legislation
Whistleblower protection legislation